Yamplier ("Yanqui") Azcuy Díaz (born January 23, 1976, in Pinar del Río) is a former professional heavyweight boxer from Cuba.

Amateur career
Diaz started boxing at the age of twelve and had 205 amateur fights (191-14). He fought as an amateur for eleven years and was a member of the Cuban national team until he was 25. Diaz fought the Félix Savón twice, and he reportedly scored two knockdowns in the fights, but Savon won both by decision.

Professional career
On August 13, 2004, Diaz upset highly regarded and undefeated Cuban heavyweight prospect and former cruiserweight champion Juan Carlos Gomez with a vicious 1-round TKO. Still in 2004 he scored a victory over former title challenger Vaughn Bean.

However, his ascension was derailed on January 22, 2005, via a 5-round TKO loss to Nigerian power puncher Samuel Peter. He did not manage to score a win ever since, losing four out of his last six fights with two no contests. His last bout was in 2006 December when he was knocked out by former world champion Oliver McCall.

His current professional record stands at 13 wins (8 KOs) 5 losses and 2 no contests in 20 bouts.

Professional boxing record

|-
|align="center" colspan=8|13 Wins (8 knockouts, 5 decisions), 5 Losses (2 knockouts, 3 decisions), 2 No Contests
|-
| align="center" style="border-style: none none solid solid; background: #e3e3e3"|Result
| align="center" style="border-style: none none solid solid; background: #e3e3e3"|Record
| align="center" style="border-style: none none solid solid; background: #e3e3e3"|Opponent
| align="center" style="border-style: none none solid solid; background: #e3e3e3"|Type
| align="center" style="border-style: none none solid solid; background: #e3e3e3"|Round
| align="center" style="border-style: none none solid solid; background: #e3e3e3"|Date
| align="center" style="border-style: none none solid solid; background: #e3e3e3"|Location
| align="center" style="border-style: none none solid solid; background: #e3e3e3"|Notes
|-align=center
|Loss
|
|align=left| Oliver "Atomic Bull" McCall
|KO
|7
|09/12/2006
|align=left| Hollywood, Florida, United States
|align=left|
|-
|Loss
|
|align=left| Damian Wills
|UD
|8
|08/06/2006
|align=left| Hollywood, California, United States
|align=left|
|-
|No Contest
|
|align=left| Jason Estrada
|NC
|1
|13/02/2006
|align=left| Providence, Rhode Island, United States
|align=left|
|-
|No Contest
|
|align=left| Derek Berry
|NC
|1
|12/11/2005
|align=left| Las Vegas, Nevada, United States
|align=left|
|-
|Loss
|
|align=left| Kirk Johnson
|TD
|5
|09/06/2005
|align=left| Temecula, California, United States
|align=left|
|-
|Loss
|
|align=left| Samuel Peter
|TKO
|5
|22/01/2005
|align=left| Miami, Florida, United States
|align=left|
|-
|Win
|
|align=left| Vaughn Bean
|SD
|10
|12/11/2004
|align=left| Green Bay, Wisconsin, United States
|align=left|
|-
|Win
|
|align=left| Marcellus Brown
|TKO
|1
|17/09/2004
|align=left| Las Vegas, Nevada, United States
|align=left|
|-
|Win
|
|align=left| Juan Carlos Gomez
|TKO
|1
|13/08/2004
|align=left| Laredo, Texas, United States
|align=left|
|-
|Win
|
|align=left| Sione Asipeli
|UD
|6
|19/06/2004
|align=left| Reno, Nevada, United States
|align=left|
|-
|Win
|
|align=left| Aurelio Perez
|UD
|8
|01/05/2004
|align=left| Miami, Florida, United States
|align=left|
|-
|Loss
|
|align=left| Tony Thompson
|UD
|8
|27/03/2004
|align=left| Stateline, Nevada, United States
|align=left|
|-
|Win
|
|align=left| Michael Simms
|MD
|6
|21/02/2004
|align=left| Reno, Nevada, United States
|align=left|
|-
|Win
|
|align=left| Jason Stinson
|TKO
|1
|11/12/2003
|align=left| Lemoore, California, United States
|align=left|
|-
|Win
|
|align=left| Roy Meador
|TKO
|3
|05/12/2003
|align=left| Los Angeles, California, United States
|align=left|
|-
|Win
|
|align=left| Germain Thedford
|UD
|4
|13/11/2003
|align=left| Las Vegas, Nevada, United States
|align=left|
|-
|Win
|
|align=left| Andriy Oliynyk
|TKO
|2
|01/11/2003
|align=left| Las Vegas, Nevada, United States
|align=left|
|-
|Win
|
|align=left| Salvador Farnetti
|KO
|2
|14/06/2003
|align=left| Las Vegas, Nevada, United States
|align=left|
|-
|Win
|
|align=left| Juan Ramon Perez
|TKO
|2
|28/03/2003
|align=left| Ciudad Juarez, Chihuahua, Mexico
|align=left|
|-
|Win
|
|align=left| Juan Ramon Perez
|TKO
|5
|01/11/2002
|align=left| Ciudad Juarez, Chihuahua, Mexico
|align=left|
|}

References

External links

 

1976 births
Living people
Heavyweight boxers
Cuban male boxers
People from Pinar del Río